is the fourteenth single by Japanese singer Beni. It was scheduled to be released on 25 January 2012 on the Nayutawave Records label. "Eien" is a wedding song, and was scheduled to be the theme song for the NHK TV series Honjitsu wa Taian Nari which starts on 10 January 2012.
The video for the lead song was recorded in Los Angeles, USA. On the recochoku weekly online charts "Eien" debuted at #7.

Track list

Charts

Reported sales

References

2012 singles
Beni (singer) songs
2012 songs